PB-41 Quetta-V is a constituency of the Provincial Assembly of Balochistan.

General elections 2018

General elections 2013

See also

 PB-40 Quetta-IV
 PB-42 Quetta-VI

References

External links
 Election commission Pakistan's official website
 Awazoday.com check result
 Balochistan's Assembly official site

Constituencies of Balochistan